Dibamus booliati, sometimes known as Boo Liat's blind lizard, is a legless lizard endemic to Peninsular Malaysia.

References

Dibamus
Reptiles of Malaysia
Endemic fauna of Malaysia
Reptiles described in 2003
Taxa named by Indraneil Das
Taxa named by Norsham S. Yaakob